The Roslin Art Gallery is an art gallery located in Glendale, California, that is dedicated to preserving Armenian folk art.

History
The Roslin Art Gallery is named after Toros Roslin, the most prominent master of the Armenian illuminated manuscripts in the Middle Ages. The gallery aspires to promote and introduce Armenian art, both historical and contemporary. The gallery was founded in 1998.

See also

 Armenian art

References

External links

Armenian-American culture in California
Art museums and galleries in California
Buildings and structures in Glendale, California
Tourist attractions in Glendale, California